Northwest Dairy Association (formerly the Northwest Dairymen's Association; Trading as Darigold, Inc.) is an American dairy agricultural marketing cooperative. Headquartered in Seattle, Washington, it is owned by about 350 dairy farm members of the association located in Washington, Oregon, Idaho, and Montana.

History 
The cooperative was founded in 1918 as the United Dairymen's Association, and it bought the Consolidated Dairy Products Company in 1930. A contest among dairy families produced the cooperative's brand name, "Darigold" in 1920. In 1999, the cooperative, in an effort to improve its marketing position, changed its name to Northwest Dairy Association, while changing the corporate name to WestFarm Foods. In 2006, the corporate name returned to Darigold. In 2010, the cooperative merged with the Montana dairy cooperative Country Classic. In August 2003, Darigold locked out their union in one production facility. Workers in that facility continue to be represented by a union, as are employees in most Darigold production facilities.  

In June 2021, Darigold announced plans to build a multi-million production facility in Pasco, Wash. that represents significant investment in climate-friendly modernization. The co-op began 2022, sharing details of a leadership transition with Stan Ryan, its CEO of six years, announcing his retirement and Darigold executive Joe Coote named CEO.

References

External links

 

Food and drink companies based in Washington (state)
Manufacturing companies based in Seattle
Agriculture in Oregon
Economy of the Northwestern United States
Dairy products companies of the United States
Agricultural cooperatives in the United States
Agricultural marketing cooperatives
1918 establishments in Washington (state)
Food and drink companies established in 1918
American companies established in 1918
Dairy cooperatives